The Chinese Century is a neologism suggesting that the 21st century may be geoeconomically or geopolitically dominated by the People's Republic of China, similar to how the "American Century" refers to the 20th century and the "British Centuries" to the 18th and 19th. The phrase is used particularly in association with the prediction that the economy of China may overtake the economy of the United States to be the largest in the world. A similar term is China's rise or rise of China.

China created the Belt and Road Initiative which according to analysts has been a geostrategic effort to take a larger role in global affairs and threatens U.S. post-war hegemony. It has also been argued that China co-founded the Asian Infrastructure Investment Bank and New Development Bank to compete with the World Bank and the International Monetary Fund in development finance. In 2015, China launched the Made in China 2025 strategic plan to further develop its manufacturing sector. There have been debates on the effectiveness and practicality of these programs in promoting China's global status.

China's emergence as a global economic power is tied to its large working population. However, the population in China is aging faster than almost any other country in history. Current demographic trends could hinder economic growth, create challenging social problems, and limit China's capabilities to act as a new global hegemon. China's primarily debt-driven economic growth also creates concerns for substantial credit default risks and a potential financial crisis.

According to The Economist, on a purchasing-power-parity (PPP) basis, the Chinese economy became the world's largest in 2013. On a foreign exchange rate basis, some estimates in 2020 and early 2021 said that China could overtake the U.S. in 2028, or 2026 if the Chinese currency further strengthened. As of July 2021, Bloomberg L.P. analysts estimated that China may either overtake the U.S. to become the world's biggest economy in the 2030s or never be able to reach such a goal. Some scholars believe that China's rise has peaked and that an impending stagnation or decline may follow.

Debates and factors 

China's economy was estimated to be the largest in the 16th, 17th century and early 19th century. Joseph Stiglitz said the "Chinese Century" had begun in 2014. The Economist has argued that "the Chinese Century is well under way", citing China's GDP since 2013, if calculated on a purchasing-power-parity basis.

From 2013, China created the Belt and Road Initiative, with future investments of almost $1 trillion which according to analysts has been a geostrategic push for taking a larger role in global affairs. It has also been argued that China co-founded the Asian Infrastructure Investment Bank and New Development Bank to compete with the World Bank and the International Monetary Fund in development finance. In 2015, China launched the Made in China 2025 strategic plan to further develop the manufacturing sector, with the aim of upgrading the manufacturing capabilities of Chinese industries and growing from labor-intensive workshops into a more technology-intensive powerhouse.

In November 2020, China signed the Regional Comprehensive Economic Partnership as a free trade agreement in counter to the Trans-Pacific Partnership. The deal has been considered by some commentators as a "huge victory" for China, although it has been shown that it would add just 0.08% to China's 2030 GDP without India's participation.

Ryan Hass, a senior fellow in foreign policy at the Brookings Institution, said that much of the narrative of China "inexorably rising and on the verge of overtaking a faltering United States" was promoted by China's state-affiliated media outlets, adding, "Authoritarian systems excel at showcasing their strengths and concealing their weaknesses." Political scientist Matthew Kroenig said, "the plans often cited as evidence of China's farsighted vision, the Belt and Road Initiative and Made in China 2025, were announced by Xi only in 2013 and 2015, respectively. Both are way too recent to be celebrated as brilliant examples of successful, long-term strategic planning."

Naughton questioned whether it is sensible for a middle income country of this kind to be taking "such a disproportionate part of the risky expenditure involved in pioneering new technologies". He commented that while it does not make sense from a purely economic perspective, Chinese policymakers have "other considerations" when implementing their industrial policy such as Made in China 2025.

Depending on different assumptions of scenarios, it has been estimated that China would either overtake the U.S. to become the world's biggest economy in the 2030s or never be able to do so.

International relations 

In 2011, Michael Beckley, a research fellow at the Harvard Kennedy School, released his journal China's Century? Why America's Edge Will Endure which rejects that the U.S. is in decline relative to China or that the hegemonic burdens the U.S. bears to sustain a globalized system contributes to its decline. Beckley argues the U.S. power is durable, and "unipolarity" and globalization are the main reasons. He says, "The United States derives competitive advantages from its preponderant position, and globalization allows it to exploit these advantages, attracting economic activity and manipulating the international system to its benefit."

Beckley believes that if the United States was in terminal decline, it would adopt neomercantilist economic policies and disengage from military commitments in Asia. "If however, the United States is not in decline, and if globalization and hegemony are the main reasons why, then the United States should do the opposite: it should contain China’s growth by maintaining a liberal international economic policy, and it should subdue China’s ambitions by sustaining a robust political and military presence in Asia." Beckley believes that the United States benefits from being an extant hegemon—the U.S. did not overturn the international order to its benefit in 1990, but rather, the existing order collapsed around it.

Scholars that are skeptical of the U.S.'s ability to maintain a leading position include Robert Pape, who has calculated that "one of the largest relative declines in modern history" stems from "the spread of technology to the rest of the world". Similarly, Fareed Zakaria writes, "The unipolar order of the last two decades is waning not because of Iraq but because of the broader diffusion of power across the world."
Paul Kipchumba in Africa in China's 21st Century: In Search of a Strategy predicts a deadly cold war between the U.S. and China in the 21st century, and, if that cold war does not occur, he predicts China will supplant the U.S. in all aspects of global hegemony.

Academic Rosemary Foot writes that the rise of China has led to some renegotiations of the U.S. hegemony in the Asia-Pacific region, but inconsistency between China's stated ambitions and policy actions has prompted various forms of resistance which leaves U.S. hegemony only partially challenged. Meanwhile, C. Raja Mohan observes that "many of China’s neighbors are steadily drifting toward either neutrality between Beijing and Washington or simply acceptance of being dominated by their giant neighbor." However, he also notes that Australia, India, and Japan have readily challenged Beijing. Richard Heyderian proposes that "America’s edge over China is its broad and surprisingly durable network of regional alliances, particularly with middle powers Japan, Australia and, increasingly, India, which share common, though not identical, concerns over China’s rising assertiveness."

In the midst of global concerns that China's economic influence included political leverage, Chinese leader Xi Jinping stated "No matter how far China develops, it will never seek hegemony". At several international summits, one being the World Economic Forum in January 2021, Chinese leader Xi Jinping stated a preference for multilateralism and international cooperation. However, political scientist Stephen Walt contrasts the public message with China's intimidation of neighboring countries. Stephen Walt suggests that the U.S. "should take Xi up on his stated preference for multilateral engagement and use America’s vastly larger array of allies and partners to pursue favorable outcomes within various multilateral forums." Though encouraging the possibility of mutually beneficial cooperation, he argues that "competition between the two largest powers is to a considerable extent hardwired into the emerging structure of the international system." According to former Singaporean Prime Minister Lee Kuan Yew, China will "[initially] want to share this century as co-equals with the U.S.", but have "the intention to be the greatest power in the world" eventually.

Writing in the Asia Europe Journal, Lei Yu and Sophia Sui suggest that the China-Russia strategic partnership "shows China’s strategic intention of enhancing its 'hard' power in order to elevate its status at the systemic (global) level." 

In 2018, Xiangming Chen wrote that China was potentially creating a New Great Game, shifted to geoeconomic competition compared with the original Great Game. Chen stated that China would play the role of the British Empire (and Russia the role of the 19th century Russian Empire) in the analogy as the "dominant power players vs. the weaker independent Central Asian states". Additionally, he suggested that ultimately the Belt and Road Initiative could turn the "China-Central Asia nexus into a vassal relationship characterized by cross-border investment by China for border security and political stability."

Rapid aging and demographic challenges 

China's emergence as a global economic power is tied to its large, working population. However, the population in China is aging faster than almost any other country in history. In 2050, the proportion of Chinese over retirement age will become 39 percent of the total population according to projections. China is rapidly aging at an earlier stage of its development than other countries. Current demographic trends could hinder economic growth, create challenging social problems, and limit China's capabilities to act as a new global hegemony.

Brendan O'Reilly, a guest expert at Geopolitical Intelligence Services, wrote, "A dark scenario of demographic decline sparking a negative feedback loop of economic crisis, political instability, emigration and further decreased fertility is very real for China". Nicholas Eberstadt, an economist and demographic expert at the American Enterprise Institute, said that current demographic trends will overwhelm China's economy and geopolitics, making its rise much more uncertain. He said, "The age of heroic economic growth is over."

Ryan Hass at the Brookings said that China's "working-age population is already shrinking; by 2050, China will go from having eight workers per retiree now to two workers per retiree. Moreover, it has already squeezed out most of the large productivity gains that come with a population becoming more educated and urban and adopting technologies to make manufacturing more efficient."

According to American economist Scott Rozelle and researcher Natalie Hell, "China looks a lot more like 1980s Mexico or Turkey than 1980s Taiwan or South Korea. No country has ever made it to high-income status with high school attainment rates below 50 percent. With China's high school attainment rate of 30 percent, the country could be in grave trouble." They warn that China risks falling into the middle income trap due to the rural urban divide in education and structural unemployment. Economists Martin Chorzempa and Tianlei Huang of the Peterson Institute agree with this assessment, adding that "China has overlooked rural development much too long", and must invest in the educational and health resources of its rural communities to solve an ongoing human capital crisis.

Economic growth and debt 

The People's Republic of China was the only major economy that reported growth in 2020, during the COVID-19 pandemic. The economy of China expanded by 2.3% while the U.S. economy and the eurozone are expected to have shrunk by 3.6% and 7.4% respectively. China's share of the global GDP rose to 16.8%, while the U.S. economy accounted for 22.2% of global GDP in 2020. By the end of 2024, however, the Chinese economy is expected to be smaller than what was previously projected, while the U.S. economy is expected to be larger, according to the International Monetary Funds 2021 report on the global economic outlook.

China's increased lending has been primarily driven by its desire to increase economic growth as fast as possible. The performance of local government officials has for decades been evaluated almost entirely on their ability to produce economic growth. Amanda Lee reports in the South China Morning Post that "as China’s growth has slowed, there are growing concerns that many of these debts are at risk of default, which could trigger a systemic crisis in China’s state-dominated financial system".

Diana Choyleva of Enodo Economics predicts that China's debt ratio will soon surpass that of Japan at the peak of its crisis. Choyleva argues "For evidence that Beijing realizes it is drowning in debt and needs a lifebuoy, look no further than the government's own actions. It is finally injecting a degree of pricing discipline into the corporate bond market and it is actively encouraging foreign investors to help finance the reduction of a huge pile of bad debt."

China's debt-to-GDP ratio increased from 178% in the first quarter of 2010 to 275% in the first quarter of 2020. China's debt-to-GDP ratio approached 335% in the second and third quarters of 2020. Ryan Hass at the Brookings said, "China is running out of productive places to invest in infrastructure, and rising debt levels will further complicate its growth path."

The PRC government regularly revises its GDP figures, often toward the end of the year. Because local governments face political pressure to meet pre-set growth targets, many doubt the accuracy of the statistics. According to Chang-Tai Hsieh, an economist at the University of Chicago Booth School of Business and research associate at the National Bureau of Economic Research, Michael Zheng Song, an economics professor at the Chinese University of Hong Kong, and coauthors, China's economic growth may have been overstated by 1.7 percent each year between 2008 and 2016, meaning that the government may have been overstating the size of the Chinese economy by 12-16 percent in 2016.

According to American strategist and historian Edward Luttwak, China will not be burdened by huge economic or population problems, but will fail strategically because "the emperor makes all the decisions and he doesn't have anybody to correct him." He said that geopolitically, China "gained one year in the race" in 2020 by using the measures of a totalitarian government, but this has brought the "China threat" to the fore, pushing other governments to respond.

Sociologist Ho-Fung Hung stated that, although China's extensive lending during the COVID-19 pandemic allowed a quick rebound after the initial lockdown, it contributed to the already deep indebtedness of many of China's corporations, slowing the economy by 2021 and depressing long-term performance. Hung also pointed out that in 2008, although it was claimed mainly in propaganda that the Chinese yuan could overtake the US dollar as a reserve currency, after a decade the yuan has since stalled and decreased in international usage, ranking below the British pound sterling, let alone the dollar.

Chinese decline 
Some scholars argue that China's rise will be over by the 2020s. According to foreign policy experts Michael Beckley and Hal Brands, China, as a revisionist power, has little time to change the status quo of the world in its favor due to "severe resource scarcity", "demographic collapse", and "losing access to the welcoming world that enabled its advance", adding that "peak China" has already come.

According to Andrew Erickson of the U.S. Naval War College and Gabriel Collins of the Baker Institute, China's power is peaking, creating "a decade of danger from a system that increasingly realizes it only has a short time to fulfill some of its most critical, long-held goals". David Von Drehle, a columnist for The Washington Post, wrote that it would be more difficult for the West to manage China's decline than its rise.

According to John Mueller at the Cato Institute, a "descent or at least prolonged stagnation might come about, rather than a continued rise" for China. He listed the environment, corruption, ethnic and religious tensions, Chinese hostility toward foreign businesses, among others, as contributing factors to China's impending decline.

See also

 China specific
 Adoption of Chinese literary culture
 Belt and Road Initiative
 Century of humiliation
 Chinese economic reform
 China's peaceful rise
 China Lobby
 Economy of China
 List of disputed territories of China
 Pax Sinica
 String of Pearls (Indian Ocean)

 Counter China
 Blue Team (U.S. politics)
 China containment policy
 Quadrilateral Security Dialogue
 Geostrategy in Central Asia
 Malabar (naval exercise)
 China–United States relations
 India–United States relations
 Japan–United States relations

 General
 Asian Century
 Indian Century
 Post–Cold War era
 Great Divergence
 Great power
 Pacific Century
 New world order
 Potential superpower
 The Next 100 Years: A Forecast for the 21st Century
 The Rise and Fall of the Great Powers

References

Further reading

 
 Brown, Kerry (2017) China's World: The Global Aspiration of the Next Superpower.  I. B. Tauris, Limited . 
 Brahm,  Laurence J. (2001) China's Century: The Awakening of the Next Economic Powerhouse.  Wiley . 
 Fishman, Ted (2006) China, Inc.: How the Rise of the Next Superpower Challenges America and the World.  Scribner . 
 Jacques, Martin (2012) When China Rules the World: The End of the Western World and the Birth of a New Global Order.  Penguin Books . 
 Hung, Ho-fung (2015). The China Boom: Why China Will Not Rule the World. Columbia University Press. . 
 Overholt, William (1994) The Rise of China: How Economic Reform is Creating a New Superpower.  W. W. Norton & Company . 
 Peerenboom, Randall (2008) China Modernizes: Threat to the West or Model for the Rest?.  Oxford University Press . 
 Pillsbury, Michael (2016) The Hundred-Year Marathon: China's Secret Strategy to Replace America as the Global Superpower.  St. Martin's Griffin . 
 Schell, Orville (2014) Wealth and Power: China's Long March to the Twenty-first Century.  Random House Trade Paperbacks . 
 Shenkar, Oded (2004) The Chinese Century: The Rising Chinese Economy and Its Impact on the Global Economy, the Balance of Power, and Your Job.  FT Press . 
 Shambaugh, David (2014) China Goes Global: The Partial Power.  Oxford University Press . 
 Womack, Brantly (2010) China's Rise in Historical Perspective.  Rowman & Littlefield Publishers . 
 Yueh, Linda (2013) China's Growth: The Making of an Economic Superpower.  Oxford University Press . 
 Dahlman, Carl J; Aubert, Jean-Eric. (2001) China and the Knowledge Economy: Seizing the 21st Century. WBI Development Studies. World Bank Publications.
 Hell, Natalie; Rozelle, Scott. (2020) Invisible China: How the Urban-Rural Divide Threatens China’s Rise. University of Chicago Press .

Economy of China
21st century in China
Superpowers